Theobald Bourke (circa 1683 – June 1726) was an Irish politician.

Bourke served as a Member of Parliament in the Irish House of Commons, representing Naas between 1713 and his death in 1726. His relation, John Bourke, took the vacant seat.

References

1707 births
1759 deaths
House of Burgh
Irish MPs 1713–1714
Irish MPs 1715–1727
Members of the Parliament of Ireland (pre-1801) for County Kildare constituencies